Lanet is a commune in the Aude department in south-western France.

Geography
The commune is located in the Corbières Massif.

The village lies in the middle of the commune, on the right bank of the Orbieu, which flows northwest through the commune.

Population

See also
Communes of the Aude department

References

Communes of Aude
Aude communes articles needing translation from French Wikipedia